Richard Anderson (1926–2017) was an American actor.

Richard, Rich, Richie, or Dick Anderson may also refer to:

Arts and entertainment
Richard Dean Anderson (born 1950), American actor
Richard L. Anderson (sound effects editor) (1977–2013), American sound effects editor
Richard Anderson (artist), American concept designer and artist
Richie Anderson (presenter), TV and radio personality who works for the BBC

Military
Richard Clough Anderson Sr. (1750–1826), American Revolutionary War veteran, surveyor of Virginia Military District
Richard H. Anderson (general) (1821–1879), American army officer and Confederate general in the American Civil War
Richard H. Anderson (pilot), U.S. Army Air Force pilot 
Richard Anderson (British Army officer) (1907–1979), British Army general
Richard B. Anderson (1921–1944), American Marine and World War II Medal of Honor recipient
USS Richard B. Anderson (DD-786), US Navy destroyer named in his honor
Richard A. Anderson (1948–1969), American Marine and Vietnam War Medal of Honor recipient

Politics
Dick Anderson (North Dakota politician) (born 1952), American politician, member of the North Dakota House of Representatives
Dick Anderson (Oregon politician) (fl. 2021), American politician, Oregon State Senator
Rich Anderson (Virginia politician) (born 1955), American politician, member of Virginia House of Delegates
Rich Anderson (Iowa politician) (born 1956), American politician, Iowa state legislator
Richard Clough Anderson Jr. (1788–1826), American lawyer, politician, and diplomat

Sports

American football
Dick Anderson (American football, born 1941), American college football coach
Dick J. Anderson (born 1944), American football player for the New Orleans Saints
Dick Anderson (born 1946), American football player for the Miami Dolphins and College Football Hall of Fame inductee
Richie Anderson (American football) (born 1971), American football player

Other sports
Richard Anderson (basketball) (born 1960), American basketball player
Richard Elias Anderson (born 1977), Canadian basketball player
Richie Anderson (BMX rider) (born 1967), American bicycle motocross (BMX) racer

Others
Richard Loree Anderson (1915–2003), American econometrician
Richard Davis Anderson (1922–2008), American mathematician
Richard Lloyd Anderson (1926–2018), BYU professor and Mormon historian
Richard C. Anderson (born 1934), American educational psychologist
Richard H. Anderson (businessman) (born 1955), American attorney and CEO (Delta Air Lines and Amtrak)

See also
Big Dad Ritch (James Richard Anderson), lead vocalist for red dirt metal band Texas Hippie Coalition
Richard Andersen (disambiguation)
Rick Anderson (disambiguation)
Richard Andersson (born 1972), Swedish musician